Briana Szabó (born 26 November 2005) is a Romanian tennis player.

She has a career-high singles ranking by the Women's Tennis Association (WTA) of 854. 

Szabó made her WTA Tour main-draw debut at the 2021 Winners Open, having received a wildcard to the singles tournament.

ITF Circuit finals

Doubles: 1 (runner-up)

ITF junior finals

Singles: 1 (1 runner–up)

Doubles: 4 (1 title, 3 runner–ups)

References

External links 
 
 

2005 births
Living people
Romanian female tennis players